Mancini is a surname of Italian origin which, etymologically, comes from the Italian adjective mancino, which literally means "left handed".

People

Art and literature
Antonio Mancini (1852–1930), Italian painter
Dominic Mancini, 15th-century traveler and author
Don Mancini (born 1963), author of Child's Play
Giulio Mancini (1559–1630), 17th-century physician, art collector and writer
Hannah Mancini (born 1980), American singer who works and lives in Slovenia
Marie Anne Mancini (1649–1714), patroness of La Fontaine

Film and television
Al Mancini (1932–2007), American actor, acting teacher and television writer
Robert Mancini (born 1964), MTV News

Music 
Francesco Mancini (composer) (1672–1737), 18th-century Italian composer
Giovanni Battista Mancini (1714–1800), Italian voice teacher
Henry Mancini (1924–1994), Grammy-winning American composer and arranger

Politics and governance
 Mancini family, Italian noble house
 Alessandro Mancini (born 1975), Captain Regent of San Marino
 Ange Mancini (born 1944), prefect of Martinique
 Giacomo Mancini (1916–2002), Italian politician
 Hortense Mancini (1646–1699), Duchess of Mazarin
 Laura Mancini (1636–1657), mother of Louis Joseph, duc de Vendôme
 Olympia Mancini (1638–1708), lover of Louis XIV and mother of Eugene of Savoy
 Pasquale Stanislao Mancini (1817–1888), Italian politician
 Remo Mancini (born 1951), Canadian politician
 Joe Manchin (born 1947), American politician from West Virginia whose last name derives from the name Mancini

Sports 
 Mancini (Brazilian footballer) (born 1980), real name Alessandro Faiolhe Amantino, Brazilian football player and former member of Atlético Mineiro
 Alberto Mancini (born 1969), Argentine tennis player
 Felice Mancini (born 1965), former Italian footballer
 Andrea Mancini (footballer, born 1996), the son of Felice Mancini, who coached Andrea in the 2010–11 season
 Francesco Mancini (footballer) (1968-2012), Italian football player
 Gianluca Mancini (born 1996), Italian football player
 Marcella Mancini (born 1971), Italian marathon runner
 Ray Mancini (born 1961), American boxer
 Roberto Mancini (born 1964), Italian football manager and former player
 Filippo Mancini (born 1990), Italian football player, oldest son of Roberto
 Andrea Mancini (born 1992), Italian football player, youngest son of Roberto
 Simone Mancini (born 1999), Italian football player
 Terry Mancini (born 1942), Irish football player
 Tommaso Mancini (born 2004), Italian football player
 Trey Mancini (born Joseph Anthony "Trey" Mancini, in 1992), American baseball player

Fictional characters
Lucy Mancini, fictitious character who: in The Godfather was the Maid of Honor at Connie Corleone's wedding and had an affair with Sonny Corleone; in The Godfather Part III, it is revealed she had conceived a child, Vincent Santino Mancini 
Michael Mancini, character on Melrose Place (1992–1999) (2009)
Vincent Mancini, illegitimate child of Sonny Corleone and Lucy Mancini, featured in The Godfather Part III

Other uses
Mancini immunodiffusion technique, or radial immunodiffusion

Italian-language surnames
Surnames of Italian origin